Modern Boy is a 2008 South Korean film about a rich, hedonistic playboy played by Park Hae-il who cannot care less that his country was colonized, and falls head over heels in love with a beautiful independence fighter.

Plot 
Seoul, 1937. Lee Hae-myeong is a rich and hedonistic playboy who cares little for the Japanese colonization of his homeland. But things change when he falls in love with bar singer Jo Nan-sil, who turns out to be a member of the Korean independence movement.

Cast 
 Park Hae-il ... Lee Hae-myeong
 Kim Hye-soo ... Jo Nan-sil
 Kim Nam-gil ... Shinsuke Hidaka, Japanese detective
 Kim Joon-bae ... Baek Sang-heo
 Kim Young-jae ... Okai ???
 Shin Goo ... Lee Hae-myeong's father
 Li Bo Wen ... Japanese detective, ???
 Joo Seok-tae ... Policeman
 Hong Seung-jin ... Cheol-kwon
 Do Ji-won ... Ishida Yoko
 Moon Won-joo as Detective

Release 
Modern Boy was released in South Korea on 2 October 2008, and topped the box office on its opening weekend with 329,956 admissions. As of 26 October, the film had received a total of 761,090 admissions, and as of 9 November had grossed a total of $3,839,780.

Awards and nominations
2008 Blue Dragon Film Awards
 Technical Award - Insight Visual
 Nomination - Best Cinematography - Kim Tae-gyeong
 Nomination - Best Art Direction - Jo Sang-gyeong, Park Ju-yeong
 Nomination - Best Music - Lee Jae-jin

2008 Korean Film Awards
 Nomination - Best Art Direction - Jo Sang-gyeong, Park Ju-yeong
 Nomination - Best Music - Lee Jae-jin
 Nomination - Best Sound - Seo Yeong-jun

2009 Grand Bell Awards
 Nomination - Best Supporting Actor - Kim Nam-gil
 Nomination - Best Art Direction - Jo Sang-gyeong
 Nomination - Best Costume Design - Jo Sang-gyeong
 Nomination - Best Visual Effects - Kang Jong-ik, Son Seung-hyeon
 Nomination - Best New Actor - Kim Nam-gil

17th Korean Culture and Entertainment Awards
 won - Best New Actor - Kim Nam-gil

References

External links 
 
 
 

2008 films
2000s Korean-language films
Films set in Korea under Japanese rule
South Korean drama films
Films directed by Jung Ji-woo
CJ Entertainment films
2000s South Korean films